The Tawi-Tawi Regional Agricultural College is a public college in the Philippines.  It is mandated to provide professional, technical, and special training and promote research, extension services, and progressive leadership in the field of agriculture and home technology.  Its main campus is located in Bongao, Tawi-Tawi.

References

State universities and colleges in the Philippines
Universities and colleges in Tawi-Tawi